Macaulay, Macauley, MacAulay, or McAulay may refer to:

Name

Surname
Macaulay (surname), an English-language surname with multiple etymological origins (also includes surnames Macauley, MacAulay and McAulay).

People

Surname
Thomas Babington Macaulay, 1st Baron Macaulay, British historian and Whig politician who played a major (and controversial) role in reforming education in India.
List of people with surnames Macaulay, MacAulay or McAulay

Given name
 George Macaulay Trevelyan, English historian
 John Babington Macaulay Baxter, New Brunswick jurist and politician
 Macaulay Culkin, American actor
 Macaulay Connor, fictional character in the play The Philadelphia Story and its adaptations

Places
 Macaulay River, in the South Island of New Zealand
 Macaulay railway station, Melbourne, Victoria, Australia
 The Macaulay Institute, a land use research institute based in Aberdeen, Scotland
 William E. Macaulay Honors College, a school which is part of City University of New York, in New York, USA
 MacAulay Field, Canadian football stadium in Sackville, NS, Canada

Families
 Clan MacAulay, a Scottish clan historically seated at Ardincaple Castle, in Scotland.
 Macaulay family of Lewis, a Scottish family historically centred on Lewis in the Outer Hebrides, in Scotland.

Mathematics
 Cohen–Macaulay ring, a commutative ring, named after Irvin Cohen and Francis Sowerby Macaulay (1862-1937).
 Macaulay computer algebra system, a computer algebra system, named after Francis Sowerby Macaulay (1862-1937).
 Macaulay2, a free computer algebra system, which is a successor of the preceding.
 Macaulay matrix, a generalization of Sylvester matrix to n homogeneous polynomials in n variables.
 Macaulay brackets, a notation used to describe the ramp function.
 Macaulay Duration, a special case of bond duration, named after Frederick Macaulay (1882-1970).

Other
 Macaulay Cup, Scottish shinty cup
 Macaulay Library, animal sound library
 MacAulay and Co, BBC Radio Scotland daily magazine

See also
 McAuley (disambiguation)
 McCauley (disambiguation)
 Macaulayism, named after Thomas Babinage Macauly, colonial policy of liquidating indigenous culture
 Aulay 
 Maulay, France
 Peter de Maulay (died 1241) counsellor to King John